Leistera is a genus of moths of the family Erebidae. The genus was erected by Charles Swinhoe in 1909.

Species
Leistera hampsonia (Bethune-Baker, 1906) New Guinea
Leistera pulchristrigata (Bethune-Baker, 1906) New Guinea
Leistera splendens (Bethune-Baker, 1906) New Guinea

References

Calpinae